Kovvali is a village Denduluru Mandal in Eluru district in the state of Andhra Pradesh in India.

Demographics 

 Census of India, Kovvali had a population of 8925. The total population constitutes 4391 males and 4534 females with a sex ratio of 1033 females per 1000 males. 842 children are in the age group of 0–6 years, with sex ratio of 1034. The average literacy rate stands at 66.79%.

References 

Villages in Eluru district